Steven Joseph Barnett (born September 8, 1978) is an American Republican politician who served as the Secretary of State of South Dakota from 2019 to 2022. He previously served as state auditor of South Dakota from 2011 to 2019.

Biography
Barnett graduated from Roncalli High School in Aberdeen, South Dakota, from where he is a native. He is the grandson of Joseph H. Barnett, who served as Speaker of the South Dakota House of Representatives in 1975 and 1976.

Barnett graduated with a bachelor's degree from the University of South Dakota and with a master's degree from the University of Sioux Falls. He served as a Constituent Services Representative for Senator John Thune from 2005 until 2010.

Barnett was first elected auditor in 2010, defeating Democratic state senator Julie Bartling with 61% of the vote. He was reelected in 2014, defeating Libertarian Kurt Evans with 80% of the vote.

Barnett was elected Secretary of State of South Dakota in 2018. Barnett ran for a second term in 2022, but lost the nomination at a party convention to Monae Johnson. Barnett resigned from office early to return to the private sector.

Personal life
Barnett and his wife, Nicole, have 3 children: Emma, Henry, and William.

References

External links
 State Auditor website

|-

|-

|-

1978 births
21st-century American politicians
Living people
Politicians from Aberdeen, South Dakota
Secretaries of State of South Dakota
South Dakota Republicans
State Auditors of South Dakota
University of Sioux Falls alumni
University of South Dakota alumni